The EMD SW1001 is a  diesel locomotive for industrial switching service built by General Motors' Electro-Motive Division between September 1968 and June 1986. A total of 230 were constructed, mainly for North American railroads and industrial operations.

The SW1001 was developed because EMD's SW1000 model had proved unpopular among industrial railroad customers, as the heights of its walkway and cab eaves were much greater than those of earlier EMD switcher models. The overall height was similar, but the SW1000's roof was much flatter in curvature. Industrial railroads that only operated switchers often had facilities designed to the proportions of EMD's earlier switchers.

The SW1001, in essence, placed the hood and powertrain of the SW1000 with the underframe and cab of the earlier SW1200. The EMD 645-series diesel engine had a deeper crankcase and oil pan than the SW1200's EMD 567-series engine. The cab was similar to that of the SW1200, but not identical; it is longer, and has a different window arrangement. The SW1001 uses the same pilot plates as the SW1000; given the lower frame height, these protrude above the walkway deck height, giving the most obvious SW1001 spotting feature.

Export models
The SW1001 locomotive type was used in a number of countries outside the USA: in the Americas four units were bought by Canadian businesses; two by Saskatchewan Power and two by the National Harbours Board. 18 by companies in Mexico: 12 by AHMSA, three by Lazaro Cardenas Steel (ArcelorMittal), and 3 by Pemex. 

In Africa five were supplied to the Boke project in Guinea in the early 1970s and 18 were acquired by the railways of Morocco (ONCF) in 1982 as type DI 500. In Asia the Korean National Railway acquired 28 between 1969 and 1971.

One was acquired in 1980 by Foster Yeoman (vehicle code Y44), and another by Hanson Aggregates in 2000 both for use on quarry industrial sites in the England. They are based at Whatley Quarry and Merehead Quarry, both part of Mendip Rail operations.

Five were bought for the government railways of Saudi Arabia in 1981.

Additionally 60 variants with a redesigned cab were built under license as the Renfe Class 310 for the railways of Spain between 1989 and 1991.

See also
List of GM-EMD locomotives

References

External links 

 The EMD SW1001 American-Rails.com

B-B locomotives
SW1001
Diesel locomotives of the United States
Railway locomotives introduced in 1968
Standard gauge locomotives of the United States
Standard gauge locomotives of Canada
Standard gauge locomotives of Mexico
Standard gauge locomotives of Guinea
Standard gauge locomotives of South Korea
Standard gauge locomotives of Morocco
Standard gauge locomotives of Saudi Arabia
Shunting locomotives